Hilda Patricia Marroquín Argueta de Morales (born 25 July 1970) is a Guatemalan public figure and the former First Lady of Guatemala since January 2016. She is the wife of former President Jimmy Morales.

Biography 
Born Hilda Patricia Marroquín Argueta, she studied at the Colegio Comercial Guatemalteco and the Universidad de San Carlos de Guatemala. She married comedian Jimmy Morales in 1989. The couple have three children. In 2014, she worked in the Ministry of Health and Public Assistance.

Marroquín became First Lady of Guatemala in January 2016. She has focused on healthcare and social issues, as well as projects focused on children and adolescents. She has maintained a moderate figure and does not make frequent public appearances. She accompanied President Morales to several state visits: Israel, she met with Nechama Rivlin and Sara Netanyahu; France, met with French President Emmanuel Macron and Brigitte Macron. She was the first wife of a Latin American head of state to arrive at the Elysee Palace during the presidency of Emmanuel Macron and the United States, with President Morales attending a banquet hosted by President Donald Trump and First Lady Melania Trump.

References

1970 births
First ladies of Guatemala
Universidad de San Carlos de Guatemala alumni
Living people
People from Guatemala City
21st-century Guatemalan women politicians
21st-century Guatemalan politicians